The 1999 Asian Wrestling Championships were held in Tashkent, Uzbekistan. The event took place from May 25 to May 30, 1999.

Medal table

Team ranking

Medal summary

Men's freestyle

Men's Greco-Roman

Women's freestyle

Participating nations 
201 competitors from 14 nations competed.

 (19)
 (22)
 (8)
 (16)
 (21)
 (20)
 (17)
 (6)
 (4)
 (3)
 (19)
 (12)
 (12)
 (22)

References
UWW Database

Asia
W
Asian Wrestling Championships
W